Flashing was foaled in March 2006 and is a graded stakes winner for Godolphin. She is trained by Saeed bin Suroor. She has won the Test Stakes and the Gazelle Stakes

References

2006 racehorse births
Thoroughbred family 14-c
Racehorses bred in Kentucky
Racehorses trained in the United States
Racehorses trained in the United Arab Emirates